The Reverend Dan Foster House is a historic house in Weathersfield, Vermont built in 1785 and expanded in 1825. It is part of the National Register of Historic Places designated Weathersfield Center Historic District.

Bibliography
Christina Tree and Rachel Carter Explorer's Guide Vermont, Thirteenth Edition ( Countryman Press, 2012) page 220

References

External links
 
 Weathersfield Historical Society

Pre-statehood history of Vermont
Historic house museums in Vermont
Museums in Windsor County, Vermont
Vermont State Historic Sites
Vermont culture
Houses in Windsor County, Vermont
National Register of Historic Places in Windsor County, Vermont
Historic district contributing properties in Vermont